The Father (Persian:پدر , pedar) is a 1996 Iranian film by director Majid Majidi. It won a number of awards at film festivals both within Iran and internationally. The word pedar means father in Persian.

Synopsis 
Fourteen-year-old Mehrollah's father is killed while a passenger on the motorcycle that Mehrollah is learning to ride. To support his family, Mehrollah takes a job in the city. Upon returning for a visit, he learns from his friend Latif that his mother has remarried to a policeman and moved to a larger house. This deeply angers Mehrollah, who refuses to
accept his new step father; he also becomes bitter towards his mother. 

Taking up residence in the family's former home, Mehrollah kidnaps his young sisters, only to have his friend Latif betray their location. Latif acts as the go between for Mehrollah and his estranged family. When Mehrollah is injured, Latif summons his step father, who takes Mehrollah home to recover. As he gets better, he steals his stepfather's service revolver, and flees to the city with Latif. The step father heads to the city on motorcycle and arrests both of the boys. Placing Latif on a bus, he takes Mehrollah back home on his motorcycle, but on the way the motorcycle breaks down and they become stranded in the desert. Through the extreme hardship that follows, Mehrollah slowly softens, and comes to accept his stepfather.

Awards
 1996, Crystal Simorgh Fajr Film Festival
 1996 Prize of the Jury San Sebastián International Film Festival
 1996 C.I.C.A.E. Award, Holden Award for the Best Script, Jury Special Prize Torino International Festival of Young Cinema
 1997, Golden Dolphin Festróia - Tróia International Film Festival
 1998, 16th Ale Kino! Festival
 Marcinek - Special Mention by Children Jury
 Special Mention by Professional Jury
 Best Foreign Child Actor or Actress - Hossein Abedini

Sources

 All Movie synopsis
 IMDB Awards section
 Italian synopsis

External links

1996 films
Films directed by Majid Majidi
Films shot in Iran
Iranian drama films
1990s Persian-language films
Crystal Simorgh for Best Film winners